Muhammad Khan Bhatti (born 12 April 1968) is a Pakistani civil servant who serves in BPS-22 grade as the Secretary, Punjab Assembly.

Early life and family

Muhammad Khan Bhatti was born in Farrukhpur Bhattian, Mandi Bahauddin on April 12, 1968. He has two brothers, Baqir Khan Bhatti and Ahmed Khan Bhatti. His nephew Sajid Ahmed Khan Bhatti remained Member of Provincial Assembly of the Punjab from Mandi Bahauddin.

Career

He joined government service as a grade-7 clerk in Agriculture Department, Punjab in 1988. In 1996, he was inducted into Punjab Assembly in grade-11. He got rapid promotions and attained grade-19 within a short span. In 2002, when Chaudhry Pervaiz Elahi became Chief Minister of Punjab, he was appointed as Additional Secretary to Chief Minister on Political Affairs. He also served as Additional Secretary and Special Secretary in Chief Minister's Secretariat during Pervaiz Elahi's stint as Chief Minister of Punjab. On March 8, 2008, he was promoted and posted as Secretary, Punjab Assembly. During PML-N's government in province of Punjab from 2008 to 2018, he was dismissed from service but Lahore High Court reinstated him.
He was posted on deputation as Principal Secretary to Chief Minister of Punjab on July 26, 2022. He was transferred to Punjab Assembly on Jan 22, 2023.

References

References

Living people
1968 births
Pakistani civil servants
Place of birth missing (living people)
University of the Punjab alumni